Shim Sung-bo (born 1972) is a South Korean film director and screenwriter.

Filmography 
Memories of Murder (2003) - screenwriter, assistant director, script editor, actor
Visiting Report in Korea (short film, 2004) - director
What the...? (2011) - director 
Haemoo (2014) - director, screenwriter

Awards 
2003 11th Chunsa Film Art Awards: Best Screenplay (Memories of Murder)
2003 2nd Korean Film Awards: Best Screenplay (Memories of Murder)
2014 15th Busan Film Critics Awards: Best New Director (Haemoo)

References

External links 
 
 
 

1972 births
Living people
South Korean film directors
South Korean screenwriters
Korea National University of Arts alumni